Saral Jeevan is first info-entertainment channel in Kannada, owned by CG Parivar Global Vision Private Limited launched on 19 February 2016 by Shri Chandrashekhar Guruji (ManavGuru).

Saral Jeevan Telecasts non-fiction programs with a focus on mythology, history, travel and insights from Indian heritage & culture.

With the objective of highlighting & infusing inherited value system and taking along the present generation through the importance of our cultural practices, Saral Jeevan's philosophy is to present inspiring, motivational and factual content that is positive in nature.

References

 http://www.indiantelevision.com/television/tv-channels/regional/kannada-infotainment-channel-saral-jeevan-to-launch-on-19-february-160215

External links
 

Kannada-language television channels
Television stations in Bangalore
2016 establishments in Karnataka
Television channels and stations established in 2016